John Feffer is an author and currently director of Foreign Policy in Focus at the Institute for Policy Studies. He is a fellow at the Open Society Foundations. His books include Crusade 2.0, (City Lights, 2012), a description of contemporary attacks on Islam, North Korea/South Korea: US Policy and the Korean Peninsula, a description of current U.S. policy towards Korea and its limitations, Power Trip, a narrative of American unilateralism during the George W. Bush administration, and  Living in Hope, a description of creative responses by local communities to the challenges of globalization. His latest book, Pandemic Pivot, published by Seven Stories Press in 2020, reflects on the impact of the COVID-19 pandemic and the potential for transformative change coming out of the pandemic.

Feffer is a contributor to The Huffington Post. He has written the plays The Pundit and The Politician, both of which were performed at the 2013 Washington's Capital Fringe Festival.

He is a member of the Democratic Socialists of America.

Awards and fellowships 
 Herbert W. Scoville Fellowship (1988)

Written works 
 Foamers: A Novel of Suspense (Scribner, 1997)
 All Over the Map (Smashwords, 2012)
 Crusade 2.0 (City Lights Publishers, 2012)
 Splinterlands (Haymarket Books, 2016)
 Aftershock: A Journey into Eastern Europe's Broken Dreams (Zed Books, 2017)
 The Pandemic Pivot: A Report from the Institute for Policy Studies, The Transnational Institute, and Focus on the Global South (Seven Stories Press, 2020)

References

External links 

 Directory of Scoville Peace Fellows, 1987–present
 Jon Berson (John Feffer)
 John Feffer's bio at the Institute for Policy Studies
 John Feffer's personal website
 

Year of birth missing (living people)
Living people
Haverford College alumni
American foreign policy writers
American male non-fiction writers
Members of the Democratic Socialists of America